China Salesman, also known as Deadly Contract and Tribal Warfare, is a 2017 Chinese action film co-written and directed by Tan Bing. The film stars Li Dongxue and features Mike Tyson and Steven Seagal. It was released in China on 16 June 2017.

Plot
Yan Jian, a young Chinese IT engineer, volunteers to go to North Africa and help the company he works for to win a competition. The winner can own the right to control the communication between South and North. French spy Michael is ordered to go to North Africa and win the competition, so that France can control the mineral resources of Africa. He hires the best mercenary in Africa, Lauder, and a former general, Kabbah, to help him. Yan discovers their conspiracy, and is the only one who can stop them.

Cast
 Li Dongxue as Yan Jian
 Mike Tyson as Kabbah
 Janicke Askevold as Susanna
 Li Ai as Ruan Ling
 Eriq Ebouaney as Sheik Asaid
 Clovis Fouin as Michael
 Steven Seagal as Lauder
 Zijian Wang as Zheng Ming
 Anthony Gavard as ONU Officer

Reception
On review aggregator website Rotten Tomatoes, the film holds an approval rating of 13% based on 16 reviews, and an average rating of 2.13/10. On Metacritic, the film has a weighted average score of 14 out of 100, based on 6 critics, indicating "overwhelming dislike".

References

External links
 

Chinese-language films
Chinese action films
Techno-thriller films
2010s English-language films